Roman Gennadyevich Ivanovsky (born 29 June 1977 in Volgograd, Soviet Union) is a retired male breaststroke swimmer from Russia, who won the silver medal in the 4×100 metres medley relay at the 1996 Summer Olympics in Atlanta, Georgia. He only swam in the preliminary heats, and was replaced in the final by Stanislav Lopukhov.

References
 

1977 births
Living people
Russian male swimmers
Male breaststroke swimmers
Swimmers at the 1996 Summer Olympics
Olympic swimmers of Russia
Olympic silver medalists for Russia
World Aquatics Championships medalists in swimming
Medalists at the FINA World Swimming Championships (25 m)
Sportspeople from Volgograd
Medalists at the 1996 Summer Olympics
Olympic silver medalists in swimming
Universiade medalists in swimming
Universiade silver medalists for Russia
Medalists at the 2003 Summer Universiade